Apax Partners LLP is a British private equity firm, headquartered in London, England. The company also operates out of six other offices in New York, Hong Kong, Mumbai, Tel Aviv, Munich and Shanghai.  As of December 2017, the firm, including its various predecessors, have raised approximately $65 billion (USD) since 1981.  Apax Partners is one of the oldest and largest private equity firms operating on an international basis, ranked the fifteenth largest private equity firm globally.

Apax invests exclusively in certain business sectors including: telecommunications, technology, retail and consumer products, healthcare and financial and business services. Looks for a target Enterprise Value of $1,000mm - $5,000mm.

Apax raises capital for its investment funds through institutional investors including corporate and public pension funds, university and college endowments, foundations and fund of funds.  One of the firm's co-founders, Alan Patricof, was an early investor in Apple Computer and America Online (AOL).

History

Apax Partners Worldwide is the product of the combination of three firms:
Patricof & Co., founded in 1969 in New York by pioneering venture capitalist Alan Patricof;
Multinational Management Group (MMG), founded in 1972 by Sir Ronald Cohen and Maurice Tchénio;
Saunders Karp & Megrue, founded in 1988 by Thomas A. Saunders III and Allan W. Karp and joined by John Megrue in 1992.

Patricof & Co. and MMG
In 1969, Alan Patricof founded Patricof & Co. a firm dedicated to making investments in "development capital" later known as "venture capital," primarily in small early-stage companies.  Patricof, one of the early venture capitalists, was involved in the development of numerous major companies including  America Online, Office Depot, Cadence Design Systems, Apple Computer and FORE Systems.  In 1975, Patricof launched 53rd Street Ventures, a $10 million vehicle.

Meanwhile, in 1972, Sir Ronald Cohen and Maurice Tchénio, along with two other partners, founded Multinational Management Group (MMG) with offices in London, Paris, and Chicago.  MMG initially was established as an advisory firm, working with small emerging companies, rather than an investment firm.  However, MMG initially struggled to gain traction amid the negative economic conditions, particularly in the UK in the mid-1970s.

By 1977, two of the original four founding partners had left MMG, leaving Cohen and Tchénio in need of a partner to help rejuvenate their firm.  In that year, Cohen approached Alan Patricof to join them and run the new firm's investments in the U.S.  The new firm would be known as Alan Patricof Associates (APA) and ultimately come to be known as Apax Partners (based on a play on Patricof's name: Alan Patricof Associates Cross (x) Border).  Following the merger, MMG abandoned its advising business, and the new APA shifted its focus exclusively to investing in start-up companies.

1980s-21st century
Throughout the 1980s, the firm grew steadily raising capital under a series of separate funds.  As the 1980s progressed, the firm introduced its first later stage venture fund in 1984, its first growth capital fund in 1987 and its first dedicated European leveraged buyout fund MMG Patricof European Buy-In Fund in 1989.  In response to the changing conditions, in the venture capital industry in the 1980s Apax (and other early venture capital firms including Warburg Pincus and J.H. Whitney & Company) began to transition away from venture capital toward leveraged buyouts and growth capital investments, which were in vogue in that decade.  This trend was more prevalent in Europe than the U.S. where Patricof preferred to continue focusing on venture investments.

In 1991, Apax Partners became the official name for all of its European operations however the U.S. business still operated under the Patricof & Co. name.  By the mid-1990s Apax had become one of the larger private equity firms globally.

In 2000, Patricof & Co. adopted the Apax Partners branding and formalized its affiliation with its European business.  The U.S. business would operate as Apax Partners, Inc.  The following year, Patricof stepped back from day-to-day management of Apax Partners, Inc., the US arm of the firm to return to his original focus on making venture capital investments in small early-stage companies.  In 2006, Patricof left Apax to form Greycroft Partners which focuses on small early-stage venture capital investments.

Despite the closer relations between the U.S. and European teams, the firm still operated separate fund entities for each geography.  The European side of the business began to pull away in terms of capital commitments, raising more than $5 billion for its 2004 vintage European fund but just $1 billion for its 2006 U.S. vintage fund.

Saunders Karp & Megrue
In 2005, Apax announced it would acquire middle market leveraged buyout firm Saunders Karp & Megrue to augment its buyout business in the United States. Saunders Karp, formerly based in Stamford, Connecticut, was founded in 1989 by Thomas A. Saunders III and Allan W. Karp.  John Megrue, who today serves as co-chairman of Bridgewater Associates, had worked as a principal at Patricof & Co. before joining Saunders Karp in 1992.  Saunders Karp had received capital commitments from institutional investors including AT&T Corporation, the General Electric Pension Trust, Goldman Sachs Private Equity Group, HarbourVest Partners, JP Morgan Fleming Asset Management, New York State Common Retirement Fund and Verizon, among others.

Investments
Pre-2000
 In 1998, Apax invested in Neurodynamics Limited, which was the parent of Autonomy Corporation.
British Telecom restructured, and agreed to sell the Yell Group Yellow pages directory business to Apax and Lion Capital LLP for £2.14 billion/$3.5 billion, making it then the largest non-corporate LBO in European history. Yell bought US directories publisher McLeodUSA for about $600 million the following year, and floated on London's FTSE in 2003.
2004
Apax purchased PCM Uitgevers.
2005
 Apax purchased a majority stake in Travelex (the world's largest foreign exchange company) for £1.06bn. In Q3 2005 Apax also announced plans to purchase Grupo Panrico, one of Spain's largest food companies and its largest bakery company.
 A partnership consisting of Apax, Saban Capital Group and Arkin Communications acquired the controlling interest (30%) in Israeli telecommunications company Bezeq in October 2005 for $923 million. The partnership sold its stake to Internet Gold – Golden Lines Ltd. subsidiary B Communications in April 2010 for $1.75 billion.
 As part of the Violet Acquisitions consortium (along with Barclays Capital and Robert Tchenguiz) Apax is involved in the December 2005 purchase of Somerfield. Somerfield was later sold to The Co-operative Group in March 2009.
 Apax floated the satellite communications company Inmarsat on the London Stock Exchange in 2015. 
2006
 Apax purchased the Tommy Hilfiger Corporation for $1.6 billion, or $16.80 a share, all in cash.  In May 2006, this deal was approved by the shareholders of Tommy Hilfiger.
 In June 2006, Apax acquired HIT Entertainment in a take-private transaction.
 Apax acquired a majority stake in Pictage, Inc. the leading provider of online solutions for professional wedding and portrait photographers.  Pictage, Inc. was co-founded by Gary Fong.
 On 21 August 2006 it was announced that Apax Partners and Bain Capital had joined the enlarged private equity consortium headed by KKR that has agreed to acquire an 80.1% stake in the Semiconductor Division of Royal Philips Electronics. The new company is called NXP Semiconductors.
 On 31 October 2006 it was announced that Apax Partners had acquired FTMSC (France Télécom Mobile Satellite Communications) which would later be rebranded under the Vizada name in June 2007. This was shortly followed by an announcement on 6 September 2007 explaining that Apax Partners had acquired Telenor Satellite Services which was to be merged into the Vizada brand.
 On 20 November 2006 Apax Partners Worldwide LLP won a tender to buy control of Tnuva. The bid values the privately held food and dairy group at $1.025 billion.
2007
 In May 2007, Apax signed definitive agreements with funds advised by Apax Partners and OMERS Capital Partners under which such funds acquired the higher education, careers and library reference assets of Thomson Learning, and a consortium of funds advised by OMERS, and Apax acquired Nelson Canada, for a combined total value of approximately $7.75 billion in cash.  The higher education, careers and library reference assets include such well-known brands and businesses as: Wadsworth, South-Western, Delmar Learning, Eddie Diamond, Gale, Heinle, Brooks/Cole, Course Technology and Nelson Canada. Nelson Canada is a leading provider of books and online resources for the educational market in Canada.  The group will be majority-owned by OMERS. The name was changed to Cengage Learning, on 24 July 2007.
 Apax sells PCM Uitgevers.
2008
In January 2008 Apax and Mivtach Shamir purchased the Tnuva company for $1.025 billion.
 In August 2008, Apax Partners completed acquisition of TriZetto Group.
 
2009
 In August 2009, Apax Partners completed acquisition of Bankrate.

2010
 In January 2010, Apax Partners acquired 76.8% of Israel-based Psagot Investment House for $570 million.
 In April 2010, Apax Partners announced acquisition of TIVIT.
 In May 2010, Apax Partners acquired a 70% stake in Sophos for $580 million.
2011
 On 25 March 2011 Apax Partners announced that it had reached a definitive agreement to purchase Trader Corporation (“Trader”) from Yellow Media for a purchase price consideration of $745M.
 On 23 December 2011 Apax Partners announced acquisition of the Swiss branch of Orange.
2012
 In February 2012, Apax sold HiT Entertainment to Mattel for $680 million.
 On 11 June 2012 an Apax-led consortium announced acquisition of Paradigm Ltd.
 In September 2012, Apax Partners forms consortium with CEO Stephen Cretier for GardaWorld Security Services.
 In November 2012, Apax Partners agrees to acquire Cole Haan and completes acquisition 4 February 2013.
2014
 On 21 January 2014 Apax bought out the remaining 50.1% share of Trader Media from the Guardian Media Group.
 On 8 December 2014 Apax announced that it had entered into a transaction agreement to acquire 100% of the shares of EVRY.
 On 9 October 2014 Apax announced that they will acquire Dutch software maker Exact.  It closed the transaction in April 2015.
2015
 2015 Apax bought 100% of Spanish real state web portal idealista.com
 In May 2015, Apax Partners agreed to purchase Quality Distribution, a Tampa, Florida-based chemical transport and logistics firm, for $800 million, including assumption of debt. The deal was completed in August 2015. 
 In December 2015, Apax Partners agreed to sell Rhiag-Inter Auto Parts Italia SpA to LKQ Corporation for $1.14 billion.
2016
 On 19 July 2016 Apax Partners agrees to acquire Boats Group. Formerly Dominion Marine Media ("DMM"), a subsidiary of Landmark Media Enterprises.
2017
 On 23 August 2017 funds advised by Apax Partners announced a definitive agreement to acquire ThoughtWorks, a global software development and digital transformation consulting company.
 In September 2017, Tom Chapman and Ruth Chapman sold a majority stake of Matchesfashion.com to private-equity funds managed by Apax Partners.
2019
 In January 2019, Apax Partners invested US$200 million in Fractal Analytics.
 In May 2019, Apax Partners purchased New Zealand e-commerce company Trade Me for US$1.7 billion.
 In July 2019, funds advised by Apax Partners acquired Baltic Classifieds Group, a business owning a portfolio of portals in Estonia, Latvia and Lithuania. 

2020
 In April 2020, Apax Partners finalized the purchase of Coalfire, a cybersecurity firm.
In Dec 2020, Azentio Software Private Limited, subsidiary of Apax Partners, buys global software products business of 3i Infotech for Rs. 1000 Cr 

2021
Apax acquired EveryAction from Insight Partners and Social Solutions from Vista Equity Partners, combining them with CyberGrants, a company it agreed to acquire in June from Waud Capital Partners. Vista kept a minority stake in the combined company, which will have annual revenue of over $200 million.

Criticism

British United Shoe machinery (2000) 
The circumstances surrounding the demerger, transfer of assets and subsequent collapse of the British United Shoe Machinery in 2000 led to questions about Apax's behaviour being raised in Parliament by MPs of both main parties.  After calls for an enquiry into the loss of hundreds of pensions were refused, Ros Altmann, the pensions expert and, as of 2015, UK Pensions minister described it  "one of the worst cases ..I have seen  ..the actions of the former owners - Apax have been immoral." The Member of Parliament Ashok Kumar said,  "I think these people needed flogging  ..these are greedy, selfish, capitalists who live on the backs of others."

Hellas Telecommunications (2015)
Following its sale of Wind Hellas in 2007, Apax and Hellas co-owner TPG were sued by former bondholders of the telecom company, who allege that Apax and TPG unjustifiably enriched themselves from Hellas and misrepresented the true state of its accounts. Apax has countered that some of these bondholders only began their dispute after passing up on the chance of selling prior to the bankruptcy of 2009, and that Apax sold the business in 2007 (almost three years before the bankruptcy) and so was not the legal owner of Hellas during the periods cited in some of the lawsuits. (In 2005 a New York judge awarded $56m to some of these bondholders, made against Hellas Telecommunications Finance and Hellas Finance, rather than Apax or TPG). Other lawsuits related to Apax and TPG's ownership of Hellas are being heard in the USA. In December 2015 a separate legal action brought by the liquidators of Hellas Telecommunications was dismissed by a Luxembourg court. In February 2018 the liquidators abandoned their UK case against Apax and TPG after four days of trial.

Notable persons

Jonathan Kestenbaum, Baron Kestenbaum (born 1959), chief operating officer of investment trust RIT Capital Partners, and a Labour member of the House of Lords

See also
 Scott Mead

References

External links
 
"How I rode the rising wave of private equity." The Sunday Times, November 4, 2007

 
 
Private equity firms of the United Kingdom
Conglomerate companies of the United Kingdom
Financial services companies based in London
Companies based in the City of Westminster
Financial services companies established in 1969
1969 establishments in England
British companies established in 1969
Conglomerate companies established in 1969